Tomas Danilevičius (born 18 July 1978) is a Lithuanian former professional footballer and president of the Lithuanian Football Federation.

Club career
Danilevičius previously played for Livorno, Arsenal (playing twice in the league, in games against Sunderland and Charlton), FC Dynamo Moscow, K.S.K. Beveren, Dunfermline Athletic, Lausanne Sports and Club Brugge. Whilst at Arsenal he scored in a pre-season game against FC Barcelona.

He was signed by Bologna in January 2007 in a co-ownership deal for €2 million. After one year at Bologna he signed a six-month loan deal with Grosseto before returning to Livorno in June 2008 for a €400,000 transfer fee and on a four-year contract.

In 2011 Danilevičius was signed by S.S. Juve Stabia on a free transfer.

International career
Danilevicius has been capped 72 times for the Lithuania national team. As of September 2009 he had scored 19 goals in 72 appearances for Lithuania, making him all-time leading scorer.

Career statistics

Club

International
Scores and results list Lithuania's goal tally first, score column indicates score after each Danilevičius goal.

References

External links
FIFA.com profile

PrvaLiga profile 

1978 births
Living people
Sportspeople from Klaipėda
Lithuanian footballers
Association football forwards
Lithuanian expatriate footballers
Expatriate footballers in England
Premier League players
Arsenal F.C. players
Expatriate footballers in Belgium
Belgian Pro League players
K.S.K. Beveren players
Expatriate footballers in Scotland
Scottish Premier League players
Dunfermline Athletic F.C. players
Club Brugge KV players
Expatriate footballers in Switzerland
Slovenian PrvaLiga players
FC Lausanne-Sport players
Expatriate footballers in Russia
Russian Premier League players
FC Dynamo Moscow players
Expatriate footballers in Italy
Serie A players
U.S. Livorno 1915 players
Serie B players
U.S. Avellino 1912 players
Bologna F.C. 1909 players
F.C. Grosseto S.S.D. players
Serie C players
S.S. Juve Stabia players
Parma Calcio 1913 players
ND Gorica players
Expatriate footballers in Slovenia
Lithuania international footballers
Association football executives